Eimantas Grakauskas (born 1 September 1947) is a Lithuanian jurist and politician.  In 1990 he was among those who signed the Act of the Re-Establishment of the State of Lithuania.

References
 Biography

1947 births
Living people
Lithuanian politicians
Lithuanian legal scholars
Lawyers from Vilnius
Vilnius University alumni
Academic staff of Vilnius University
20th-century Lithuanian lawyers
21st-century Lithuanian lawyers
21st-century Lithuanian educators
Signatories of the Act of the Re-Establishment of the State of Lithuania